Holy Trinity High School is a co-educational learning environment located centrally in Hicksville, Nassau County, New York on Long Island. Education is based on New York State Education Standards with a strong emphasis on Religious Studies.  It is operated by the Roman Catholic Diocese of Rockville Centre. It is particularly well known for its Performing Arts Department and theatrical performances.

Academic program 

HTHS was selected by the U.S. Department of Education as one of the most outstanding high schools in the nation.
It is accredited by AdvancED, North Central Association and the Board of Regents of the University of the State of New York.  Holy Trinity has Regents exams in the following subject areas: Integrated Algebra, Math B, Global History and Geography, US History, English, Spanish, French, Chemistry, Biology, Earth Science, Physics. In order to enroll in the school must take the Catholic High School Entrance Exam.

 Guidance Resource Center using the COIN Career Community electronically links students, high schools and colleges for career and financial aid exploration and direct application for college admission.
 Comprehensive Visual Arts Program includes fine art, commercial art, computer graphics, CAD (Computer-Aided Drafting) and architectural design.

Computer technology 
Over 500 computers are available to students in networked labs, the library media center, classrooms, and the Guidance Resource Center; all have Internet access. In 2016 Chromebooks were introduced for the freshmen, and by 2020 every student had their own Chromebook.

Advanced Placement and College Level Courses 

Holy Trinity has a wide variety of AP (Advanced Placement) courses available to students who qualify:
AP World History,
AP US History,
AP Government and Politics,
AP Biology,
AP Chemistry (2008–2009 school year),
AP Physics B,
AP Calculus AB,
AP English Literature,
AP English Language,
AP Spanish.

These classes require rigorous work and studying in preparation for the national AP exam which is held in early May. Many requirements must be met to take an AP class. Averages and ability are major components as to whether or not students get into the program.

Holy Trinity offers college courses in which students can earn college credits from St. John's University:
Spanish,
English,
French,
St. John's University Art Program,
Economics.
These are college level courses. Students taking them are expected to maintain certain averages and complete all components of the course.

Religion courses 

In addition to a students "core credit classes," each student is required to take four years of religious education. Courses cover all aspects of religion from theology to morality. Students can take what they learn in the classroom and carry it with them throughout their lives.

Performing Arts program 

The Performing Arts program offers the arts as part of the curriculum towards either Regents or Honors diplomas. Students study dance and theater (or band) in place of gym and visual arts, with one year of theater arts substituted for choir. In the early 2000s, Holy Trinity put on the first high school production of Les Misérables in the world.

The athletic camps run for kids in grades 3 or 4 through high school. Offered sports are:
Football,
Baseball,
Softball,
Boys Basketball,
Girls Basketball,
Boys Lacrosse,
Girls Lacrosse,
Girls Volleyball,
Cheerleading,
Wrestling,
Boys Soccer,
Girls Soccer.

Sports teams 
Holy Trinity has numerous sports teams for both boys and girls. The teams include Baseball, Softball, Cross Country, Boys Spring Track, Girls Spring Track, Boys Winter Track, Girls Winter Track, Boy Lacrosse, Girls Lacrosse, Boys Swimming, Girls Swimming, Boys Volleyball, Girls Volleyball, Boys Golf, Girls Golf, Boys Bowling, Girls Bowling, Cheerleading, Football, Girls Badminton, Girls Basketball, Boys Basketball, Girls Gymnastics, Kickline, and Wrestling.

Holy Trinity Boys Basketball team won the CHSAA championship in 2019 against Chaminade 
https://www.newsday.com/sports/high-school/boys-basketball/holy-trinity-chaminade-basketball-chsaa-championship-1.27809728

School awards and achievements 
Holy Trinity Diocesan is the recipient of the following awards and accreditations:
The University of the State of New York Board of Regents (Accreditation)
AdvancED, North Central Association (Accreditation)
United States Department of Education (Accreditation)
Presidential Award of Excellence-Exemplary Secondary School (Award)
 Winner of 2012 Long Island Press' "Best of Long Island" poll: Best High School Spirit, Best Catholic School, Best Principal & Best Teacher

Notable alumni 
Kevin Conry - head coach men's lacrosse University of Michigan
Shana Cox  – track and field sprinter
Matt Doherty – men's college basketball coach
Christopher P. Eldredge - Former President & CEO of DFT, which was sold to DLR for $7.9B
Ralph Perretta – professional NFL player
Ryan Colucci - film producer/director
Jean Shafiroff – philanthropist and socialite
Jenna Ushkowitz – cast member of Glee
Jack Wagner - NCAA Champion (2013), 5 Time NCAA All-American, 3 Time Pac-12 Conference Champion, 6 Time Olympic Trials Qualifier (2012) - University of Southern California Men's Division I Swimming
Maurice Richardson - NBA Employee & Video Editor
Tim Dillon - Comedian
Kerry Connolly - Head Coach of St. Joseph's College Women's Basketball Team

References

External links

 Holy Trinity High School website

Catholic secondary schools in New York (state)
Educational institutions established in 1966
Roman Catholic Diocese of Rockville Centre
Schools in Nassau County, New York
1966 establishments in New York (state)